Mo i Rana Station is a railway station located in the town of Mo i Rana in the municipality of Rana in Nordland county, Norway.  The station is located along the Nordland Line and has been in operation since 1942.  Since 10 January 1943, Norsk Spisevognselskap has operated a restaurant at the station.

References

External links 
 

Railway stations in Nordland
Railway stations on the Nordland Line
Railway stations opened in 1942
1942 establishments in Norway
Rana, Norway
Mo i Rana